John Hills may refer to:
 Sir John Hills (social scientist) (1954–2020), English sociologist and academic
 John Hills (footballer) (born 1978), English footballer 
 John Hills (racehorse trainer) (c. 1960–2014), British racehorse trainer
 John Hills (politician) (1867–1938), British Conservative politician
 John Hills (priest) (died 1626), priest and academic

See also
 John Hill (disambiguation)
 Hills (disambiguation)